John Charles LeCompt (born March 10, 1973) is an American guitarist who has been part of the Little Rock metal music since the mid-1990s. He played rhythm guitar for the rock band Evanescence from 2003 to 2007. One of LeCompt's main collaborators is long-time friend musician Rocky Gray. They both are members of the rock bands Machina and We Are the Fallen.

Career 
His first commercial endeavor was the Christian metal band Mindrage, in which he performed as both lead vocalist and lead guitarist.  Enlisted for the project was Nick Williams on bass and Chad Wilburn on drums. Mindrage signed to Bulletproof Records and in June 1998 recorded the studio album Sown In Weakness, Raised In Power, consisting of eleven tracks. Their second album was a split EP with band Nailed Promise featuring four tracks released on Pluto Records. For this album, Justin Carder replaced Wilburn on drums.

LeCompt later joined with then-Living Sacrifice guitarist Rocky Gray to form what would be known as Kill System, alongside Chad Moore (Soul Embraced) on bass, Allen Robson (Becoming Saints) on guitar, and Lance Garvin (also of Living Sacrifice & Soul Embraced) on drums. The project never obtained an official distribution deal.

LeCompt joined Evanescence alongside Gray as a touring musician in 2003, and played guitar with the band until 2007. LeCompt eventually joined back up with Gray to collaborate with Gray's band Soul Embraced.  LeCompt played guitar during many of the band's live shows, and was the featured vocalist on the track "Seems Like Forever" on the album, Immune. LeCompt joined Gray and former Evanescence member Ben Moody for the band We Are the Fallen.

Hardware
LeCompt uses a variety of guitars, both electric and acoustic.  For electric, he uses a number of ESP models, including the F-300FM, EC-1000, Viper-301, Viper Custom, Grynch, PC-1V PW, SC608B, H-301 and H-307.  His acoustic guitars include the Yamaha CPX900 and LJX6C models.  For amplification, he stated that he uses a Mesa Stiletto Deuce.

References

Further reading
Former EVANESCENCE Members Sign MACHINA Deal With ROGUE RECORDS – September 12, 2012 http://www.blabbermouth.net/news.aspx?mode=Article&newsitemID=179346
Album Review of Machina's "To Live and Die in the Garden of Eden" http://pittsburghmusicmagazine.com/2012/10/17/machinas-to-live-and-die-in-the-garden-of-eden/

External links

1973 births
American performers of Christian music
American heavy metal guitarists
American heavy metal singers
American male singers
Evanescence members
Living people
Musicians from Little Rock, Arkansas
We Are the Fallen members
Guitarists from Arkansas
American male guitarists
21st-century American singers